Nemotha is a genus of praying mantids in the family Hymenopodidae: tribe Anaxarchini, containing a single described species, Nemotha metallica.  The genus was previously placed in the Iridopterygidae, and two species have been placed in the revived genus Tricondylomimus. It is found in Asia.

References

External links
 

Mantodea genera
Insects of Southeast Asia
Monotypic insect genera